is the ninth-highest mountain in Scotland and the British Isles, with a height of . It stands a short distance northeast of Ben Nevis, the highest mountain in Britain, to which it is linked by the 'Càrn Mòr Dearg arête'. Along with Càrn Dearg Meadhanach ('middle red peak') and Càrn Beag Dearg ('little red peak'), it makes up the eastern ridge of the horseshoe-shaped Ben Nevis massif in the Scottish Highlands.

Climbing
The ascent of Càrn Mòr Dearg from the north (start from the North Face Car Park), the traverse of the arête, and the scramble up the north side of Ben Nevis make one of the best horse-shoe routes in Scotland.

Snow sports
Càrn Mòr Dearg is attractive to ski mountaineers and off piste skiers and boarders. In good conditions the summit can be reached from the nearby Nevis Range Ski areas in two hours or less. With enough snow, the descent from the summit to the CIC Hut gives a long, pleasant grade 1 descent. The eastern flank of the mountain has three fine bowls which give descents graded between 2 and 5 in K. Biggin's guide.

Gallery

See also
 Geology of Scotland
 List of Munro mountains
 Mountains and hills of Scotland

References 

Lochaber
Munros
Marilyns of Scotland
Mountains and hills of the Central Highlands
Mountains and hills of Highland (council area)
One-thousanders of Scotland